Melissa ("Mel") Leonetti is a field hockey defender from the United States, who earned her first career cap versus Canada on January 23, 2004, at Stanford, California. Leonetti attended the Old Dominion University.

International senior competitions
 2004 – Pan American Cup, Bridgetown (2nd)
 2005 – Champions Challenge, Virginia Beach (5th)
 2006 – World Cup Qualifier, Rome (4th)
 2006 – World Cup, Madrid (6th)

References
 USA Field Hockey

1982 births
Living people
American female field hockey players
Old Dominion University alumni
People from Springfield Township, Montgomery County, Pennsylvania
21st-century American women